The 1984 NCAA Division II Soccer Championship was the 13th annual tournament held by the NCAA to determine the top men's Division II college soccer program in the United States.

Florida International defeated defending champions Seattle Pacific in the final, 1–0 (after one overtime period), to win their second Division II national title. The Golden Panthers (14-4-3), who previously won in 1982, were coached by former NFL player Karl Kremser.

The final match was played on December 8 at Memorial Stadium in Seattle, Washington.

Bracket

Final

See also  
 NCAA Division I Men's Soccer Championship
 NCAA Division III Men's Soccer Championship
 NAIA Men's Soccer Championship

References 

NCAA Division II Men's Soccer Championship
NCAA Division II Men's Soccer Championship
NCAA Division II Men's Soccer Championship
NCAA Division II Men's Soccer Championship
Soccer in Florida